The Eyüp Gondola, a.k.a. Eyüp–Piyerloti Aerial Cable Car, is a two-station gondola-type line of aerial lift passenger transport system located in Eyüp district of Istanbul, Turkey. It is operated under the line number Tf2 by Istanbul Transport Company, a subsidiary of Istanbul Metropolitan Municipality. The fare is paid by the contactless smart card of Istanbulkart, which is valid at all public transport in Istanbul.

Gondola lift system
The line was built by the Italian company Leitner Ropeways of Leitner Group. It is a two-station overhead transport system  with a single support tower in the middle of the line distance. The pulse-movement gondola (Mono-cable gondola fixed grip pulsed) system runs two sets of two fixed grip cabins in tandem, which are carried and hauled by a single rope. The two cabins slow down when approaching the terminal, and stop upon arrival at the platform. After simultaneous unloading and reloading, the cabins run back. There are two sets of two unidirectional carriers of type GFR8 each capable of eight passengers.

The Eyüp station offers a parking lot for visitors.

Safety
The safety system of the aerial lift line is automatically activated in case of emergency and stops the ride. Such dangerous cases are strong wind, derailing of the rope, stopping of cabin at incorrect station location and speed over limit. The failure is displayed on the control computer. Various technical data regarding the status of the line such as the distance of the cabins from the stations, cabin speed, DC motor current and torque, positions of the safety switches, failure checklist, active failures and wind speed motor are available to the station operators by computers. The seats in the cabin are foldable to make place for wheelchairs.

Specifications
 Line length: 
 Number of stations: 2
 Number of cabins: 4 (2 sets of 2 cabins in tandem)
 Trip duration: 2.75 minutes
 Operational hours: 8:00 - 23:00 (summer season), 8:00 - 22:00 (winter season)
 Daily ridership: 4,000 passengers daily
 Number of daily trips: 200
 Frequency: 5 minutes during peak hours
 Commercial speed: 
 Maximum load capacity per single cabin (8 persons): 650 kg
 Transportation capacity: 576 passengers hourly
 Trip duration (including departure from one station and stopping at the other): 165 seconds
 Average number of trips per hour: 18

Stations

Eyüp By T5 Tramway

Piyer-Loti (no entegration)

Piyerloti Hill
The gondola line was built to provide easy access for local and foreign tourists to the Piyerloti Hill by avoiding a walk through the big Eyüp Cemetery on a hillside. At  altitude, the Piyerloti Hill is named after the French naval officer, novelist and Orientalist Pierre Loti (1850–1923), who used to visit the site during his time in Istanbul. The historic Rabia Kadın Café on the top of the hill, at which he used to drink Turkish coffee, was later renamed also after him. Another establishment on the hill, of which name recalls him, is a restaurant named after his novel Aziyadé, which is the name of the main character as an Ottoman woman. There are six historic mansions on the hill, which were restored in 2000 and converted into hotels  having 130-bed capacity in 68 rooms in total. There is a coin-operated telescope on the observation deck at the Piyerloti station.

See also
 List of gondola lifts in Turkey

References

External links

Transport in Istanbul
Gondola lifts in Turkey
Golden Horn
Eyüp
2005 establishments in Turkey
Transport infrastructure completed in 2005